The Archipelago of Lavezzi is a collection of small granite islands and reefs in the Strait of Bonifacio that separates Corsica from Sardinia in the Mediterranean Sea.  They are administered from the town of Bonifacio (French department of Corse-du-Sud) on Corsica.

Geography

They include the southernmost point of Metropolitan France.

The two main islands are Cavallo (112 ha), the only inhabited island in the archipelago, and Lavezzu (Italian: Lavezzo, 66 ha), just on the south of Cavallo. The other islands or islets are, from west to east: Piana, Ratino, Porraggia and Sperduto (or Perduto).

History
The archipelago was the site of the shipwreck of the French frigate Sémillante on February 15, 1855. On the island of Lavezzu there are two memorial cemeteries with the remains of the victims of the shipwreck.

Bird colony
Between 255 and 400 pairs of Scopoli's shearwaters (Calonectris diomedea) breed each year on Lavezzu. The breeding success of the shearwaters has increased since black rats (Rattus rattus) were eradicated from the island in 2000.

These islands were the locale for Brigitte Bardot's 1952 film Manina, la fille sans voiles.

See also
 Maddalena archipelago

References

External links

 
Extreme points of France